The 2000 World Karate Championships are the 15th edition of the World Karate Championships, and were held in Munich, Germany from October 12 to October 15, 2000.

Medalists

Men

Women

Medal table

References

External links
 World Karate Federation
 Official Website
 Karate Records – World Championship 2000
 Results

World Championships
World Karate Championships
World Karate Championships
Karate Championships
2000s in Munich
Karate competitions in Germany
October 2000 sports events in Europe